This is a list of members of the Australian Capital Territory Legislative Assembly from 2001 to 2004.

 Liberal member Gary Humphries resigned on 25 November 2002 to take up the position in the Australian Senate that had been vacated by Margaret Reid. The vacancy was filled by Liberal Jacqui Burke.
 Helen Cross was expelled from the Liberal Party on 23 September 2002 after tensions with other party members. She served out the remainder of her term as an independent.

See also
2001 Australian Capital Territory general election

Members of Australian Capital Territory parliaments by term
21st-century Australian politicians